Jean Bernard Djambou (born 11 May 1947) is a former Cameroonian cyclist. He competed in the individual road race and team time trial events at the 1972 Summer Olympics.

References

External links
 

1947 births
Living people
Cameroonian male cyclists
Olympic cyclists of Cameroon
Cyclists at the 1972 Summer Olympics
Place of birth missing (living people)